The Proto-Auto Lola B08/70 is a Daytona Prototype sports car built in 2008 by Lola Cars and sold by Proto-Auto LLC.

It was débuted by Krohn Racing at the GAINSCO Grand Prix of Miami, the second round of the 2008 Rolex Sports Car Series season, after Krohn Racing has used the previous year's Riley at the 24 Hours of Daytona. Originally powered by a Pontiac 5.0 litre V8 engine, it received a new Ford "Cammer" for 2009, producing .

The car scored its first win at the 2009 Verizon Wireless 250 at the Thunderbolt Raceway, with Niclas Jönsson and Ricardo Zonta at the wheel.

References

External links
  PDF Specs

Sports prototypes